La Cruz Hill is a hill located in Pichilemu, Chile; the tallest point of the city. The hill is named after the cross located at its top.

Mountain bike competitions take place regularly on the hill, which is also one of the main attractions of Pichilemu.

References

Pichilemu
Landforms of O'Higgins Region
Tourist attractions in O'Higgins Region
Hills of Chile